Ultras are a type of association football fans who are renowned for their fanatical support. The term originated in Italy, but is used worldwide to describe predominantly organised fans of association football teams. The behavioural tendency of ultras groups includes their use of flares (primarily in tifo choreography), vocal support in large groups and the displaying of banners at football stadiums, all of which are designed to create an atmosphere which encourages their own team and intimidates the opposing players and their supporters. The frequent use of elaborate displays in stadiums is also common.

Ultras groups and their actions are extreme and they are influenced and directly linked to nationalism and patriotic behaviors. In some instances, this goes to the point where the passionate and loyal support of one's team becomes secondary to the theoretical ideology of the ultras phenomenon. In recent decades, the culture has become a focal point for the movement against the commercialisation of sports and football in particular. Ultras also have regional variants and analogues, such as the barra bravas in Hispanic America and Torcidas Organizadas in Brazil.

History

The origin of the ultras movement is disputed, with many supporters groups from various countries making claims solely on the basis of their dates of foundation. The level of dispute and confusion is aided by a contemporary tendency (mainly in Europe) to categorise all groups of overtly fanatical supporters as ultras. Supporters groups of a nature comparable to the ultras have been present in Brazil since 1939, when the first torcida organizada was formed (although these groups began to focus on violence in the 1970s). Inspired by the torcidas and the colourful scenes of the 1950 World Cup, supporters of Hajduk Split formed Torcida Split on 28 October 1950. The group is often cited as the oldest torcida style group in Europe. But the first supporters' groups in the world formed to produce violence were barras bravas, originated in Argentina in the 1950s.

One country closely associated with the ultras movement is Italy. The first Italian ultras groups were formed in 1951, including the Fedelissimi Granata of Torino. The 1960s saw the continuing spread and development of the culture with the formation of the Fossa dei Leoni and Boys San groups, the former often regarded in Italy as the first full-fledged ultras group (associated with violence). The term ultras was used as a name for the first time in 1969 when supporters of Sampdoria formed the Ultras Tito Cucchiaroni with an acronym of Uniti Legneremo Tutti i Rossoblu A Sangue (such as  "all together we will beat the rossoblu fans to blood", fans of Torino change her name the Ultras Granata in the 70s. The style of support that would become synonymous with Italian football developed most during the 1970s as more groups formed including the radical S.S. Lazio Ultras in 1974 with a strong predominance of fascist slogans and chants amongst other groups such as Hellas Verona supporters. The active support of the ultras became more apparent, in contrast with the "traditional" culture, choreographic displays, signature banners and symbols, giant flags, drums and fireworks became the norm as groups aimed to take their support to higher levels. The decade also saw the violence and unrest of Italian society at the time overlap with the ultras movement, adding a dimension that has plagued it ever since. The ultras movement spread across Europe, Australia, Asia and North Africa during the 1980s, 1990s and 2000s, starting with the countries geographically closest to Italy.

Europe

Scotland 
Green Brigade are an ultras group that follow Celtic F.C. and regularly make tifo displays and often voice support for a United Ireland. They are left-wing and anti-racist. 
On the other side of Glasgow are the Rangers F.C ultra group The Union Bears. The Union Bears are known for their elaborate fan displays and their support for Northern Irish and Scottish unionism within the UK. Block Seven are a supporters group that support Hibernian FC, the Gorgie Ultras support rivals, Heart of Midlothian FC.

England 
In England, there are ultras groups at Middlesbrough F.C (Red Faction), Crystal Palace F.C. (Holmesdale Fanatics), Ipswich Town F.C (Blue Action), Leicester City F.C (Union FS), Tottenham Hotspur (Yid Army), Huddersfield Town F.C, and Stockport County (Hatters 83). Several non-league football teams in England have ultras groups that are left-wing such as the fans of Dulwich Hamlet F.C. who have a group called The Rabble. A Vice article claims Casuals United are at war with anti-fascist football ultras.

In late 2022, an Arsenal F.C. supporters group called the “Ashburton Army” gained prominence, taking their name from Ashburton Grove, an historic road upon which the team’s Emirates Stadium was built.

Hungary 

Several clubs in Hungary have large ultras groups, such as Ferencváros (Green Monsters), Újpest (Viola Fidelity), Diósgyőr (Ultras Diósgyőr), Honvéd (Ultras Kispest, Északi Kanyar), Fehérvár (Red Blue Devils), Tatabánya (Turul Ultrái) and Debrecen (Szívtiprók Ultras Debrecen).  The national team of Hungary has an ultras group known as the Carpathian Brigade. The group was formed in 2009. Hungarian ultras occupy sector B Central at the Puskás Aréna.

Portugal

Denmark 
FC Copenhagen (Sektion 12) and Brøndby IF (Sydsiden) have some of the most renowned ultras groups on the continent, and the derby between the two is also one of the fiercest in Europe.

AaB's Ultra group caused a 14-minute delay in the 2020 Danish Cup final for a failure to adhere to COVID-19 social distancing rules. The group was ultimately ejected from the stadium and the game resumed, which was won by SønderjyskE.

Italy 
In Italy, most professional football clubs have an ultras group which attends every match and has dedicated seating areas in either the north or south end of the stadium behind the goals. Each ultras group will have one or more leaders who choreograph chants, and who hand out banners and flags to other people in the stand to wave throughout the match. Ultras have been credited with creating fantastic atmospheres inside the stadium; however they have also come under universal criticism because of ties to various gangs and the mafia, as well as causing violence which often takes place outside the stadium prior to a match. Over the years inappropriate chanting has resulted in the FIGC issuing partial or full stadium bans to clubs. The ultras will choreograph a wide range of chants throughout a match, but some of the most common chants that result in a ban are anti-Southern chants towards clubs which are located in the South of Italy, most notably towards Napoli, as well as racist chants towards opposition players. However, these issues only partially represent parts of the Ultras culture in Italy - Ultras in Italy are also known for fighting criminals and the Mafia, giving housing to immigrants or helping Italian citizens in need, as well as aiding with food and money during the Covid pandemic to their local hospitals.

Poland 
The first Polish ultras groups were formed in 1980s by fans of Legia Warszawa and Arka Gdynia. Those early ultra groups identified as either fascist or national-socialist and opposed communist government of Wojciech Jaruzelski. The 1990s saw the continuing spread and development of the ultra culture with the formation of the Wisła Sharks and Cracovia Jude Gang groups, the former often regarded in Poland as the first full-fledged ultras group. With intimidating and non-stop chanting, they've made their presence felt in the stands.

Spain 
Spanish ultraism is generally agreed to have come from Italian and English ultraism and hooliganism at the 1982 World Cup held in Spain. Held only seven years after the death of Franco, the World Cup was an opportunity for Spain to join the world of modern international football. Spanish ultraism is particularly known for its dramatic and polarized distinction across two ideological cleavages: fascism and nationalism. The vast majority of ultra groups identify as either fascist or anti-fascist, and either independentist or nationalist.

Bosnia and Herzegovina 
Bosniaks are known for their national ultras group BHFanaticos. Also, they have a few ultras that are connected to a football clubs Manijaci, Horde zla, Lešinari, Red Army, Škripari, Ultrasi and many more.

Malta 
Although small in size, Malta has some notable ultras groups. The main ultras groups in Malta are Birkirkara Ultras 1997, Ultas Beltin 99, and Paola Boys Hibs Ultras, as well as the Maltese national football team ultras group, the South End Core.

Ukraine

Romania 
Romania's ultras only finds itself in the traditional teams like Steaua București, Dinamo București and Rapid București. But there are some small ultras groups which support their local club. The biggest ultras groups are: Peluza Sud Steaua, Peluza Cătălin Hîldan and Peluza Nord Rapid.

Türkiye 
One of the biggest Ultras in the world, and the biggest in Türkiye is UltrAslan who support the highly decorated club of Galatasaray. The name of the organisation is a portmanteau word combining the concepts of "Ultras" and "Aslan" (the lion) which is a symbol of Galatasaray.

Bulgaria 
The most famous ultras in Bulgaria are Sector G (CSKA Sofia), Sector B (Levski Sofia), Bultras (Botev Plovdiv), Lauta Army (Lokomotiv Plovdiv).

Africa

Algeria

Morocco

Egypt 
The clubs in Egypt became a major political force during the uprising against Mubarak in 2011, but were known for long-standing animosity with the police. When 38 members of the Ultras Devils were arrested in Shebeen al-Kom for "belonging to an illegal group" plus additional violent offences, it was seen as a crackdown on the organisations by authorities.

In 2013, the Associated Press stated that the Egyptian Ultras network was one of the most organised movements in Egypt after the Muslim Brotherhood.

Tunisia

Asia

Cyprus 
Gate-9 (Greek:Θύρα 9) is a Cypriot fans' group that supports the football team People's Athletic Club Omonia 1948 and all the sport departments of AC Omonia except football.
Omonia supporters are traditionally left wing. A 2009 gallop poll estimated that three out of four Omonia fans vote for the Progressive Party of Working People, the communist party of Cyprus. While the group retains its left wing beliefs, in recent years it has been openly critical of the party's involvement in the club's administrative decisions. The party has denied accusations that it influences club decisions. Gate-9 members are associated with communist beliefs and have been noted for waving banners bearing Che Guevara's portrait, and other communist symbols. The group is also involved in humanitarian work for refugees in Cyprus. The group, besides Nicosia, has fan clubs in Limassol, Athens, Thessaloniki, Larnaka, Paphos, and London.

Lebanon 
The ultras scene was introduced to Lebanon in February 2018, with Nejmeh's "Ultras Supernova".and White ultras for racing Beirut 2019 Their rivals Ansar quickly followed with their own ultras group, "I Tifosi", one month later. Ahed formed their own ultras group, called "Ultras Yellow Inferno", the same year. Prior to the Arab Club Champions Cup game between Nejmeh and Al-Ahly of Egypt, played on 13 August 2018, seven "Ultras Supernova" fans were arrested by the Egyptian national security because of the negative connotations the word "Ultras" has in Egypt. The fans have been returned to Lebanon by request of the Lebanese Ambassador to Cairo.

United Arab Emirates 

Al-Wasl SC

Ultras Junoon is an Emirati group that was founded in 2010 by the fans of Al-Wasl Club. This club is considered to have the largest fan base in the Emirates, and Al-Wasl Club fans are considered the first club that came up with the idea of Ultras in the Gulf region. It is mentioned that Al Wasl fans were the main reason for increasing excitement in the region and increasing the viewership of the league in the Emirates in particular. The Ultras Junoon have a great ability to preserve the history of this club, and they are close to making any decision in the interest of this club.

The (Death Note) Tifo Made by (Ultras Junoon)

[ Al Wasl's Argentinian coach Diego Maradona during his team's GCC Champions League semifinal match against Al Khor ]

Picture by Vinod Divakaran

India 

The Ultras scene in India was introduced by East Bengal Ultras, the Ultras group of East Bengal F.C. in 2013 and since then it grew slowly as Ultras groups of various clubs started to form and display of "Tifo's" and "Pyro" shows became very much a part of the Ultras scene in Indian football.

One of the most supported club in Asia, Kerala Blasters FC has their supporters group called Manjappada (Yellow Army). They were founded in May 2014 and became ultras in 2018. During their home matches at Jawaharlal Nehru Stadium (Kochi) the group commits to cover the stadium in as much as yellow colours, which is the primary colour of the club.

Highlander Brigade, the biggest supporters' club of Northeast United FC is also growing in numbers. With intimidating large sized tifos and non-stop chanting, they've made their presence felt in the stands. Formed in 2017, they are quickly developing the Ultras scene in the Northeastern part of the country. During home games at the Indira Gandhi Athletic Stadium in Guwahati, their typical routine begins with a march to the stadium, followed by the display of tifos and banners before the start of the game and then 90 mins of intense chanting with megaphones and drums while waving flags of red, black and white.
 
Blue Pilgrims is an organised group of football fans who support the India national football men's team, women's team, and all the other age–group national teams at every home and away game formed by a group of football fans of several club fan bases of football clubs from India. Founded in 2017 before the commencement of the 2017 FIFA U-17 World Cup, which was held in India, the group based their name on the nickname of the national team, the "Blue Tigers". They consider travelling with the national teams to wherever the teams play as their pilgrimage. They often display flags, banners, and tifos in support of the national team.

Oceania

Australia

New Zealand

North America

Canada

United States

Characteristics
Ultras groups are usually centred on a core group of founders or leaders (who tend to hold executive control), with smaller subgroups organised by location, friendship or political stance. Ultras tend to use various styles and sizes of banners and flags bearing the name and symbols of their group. Some ultras groups sell their own merchandise to raise funds for performing displays. An ultras group can number from a handful of fans to hundreds or thousands, with larger groups often claiming entire sections of a stadium for themselves. Ultras groups often have a representative who liaises with the club owners on a regular basis, mostly regarding tickets, seat allocations and storage facilities. Some clubs provide groups with cheaper tickets, storage rooms for flags and banners and early access to the stadium before matches to prepare displays. These types of favoured relationships are often criticised when ultras groups abuse their power.

Hooliganism

While ultras groups can become violent, the majority of matches attended by ultras conclude with no violent incidents. Unlike hooligan firms, whose main aim is to fight hooligans of other clubs, the main focus of ultras is generally to support their own team. Some hooligans try to be inconspicuous when they travel; usually not wearing team colours, to avoid detection by the police. Within the ultra or hooligan culture however, those dressing to "blend in" would be referred to as casuals, which is viewed by some as a branch of hooliganism, yet still maintaining its own independence and culture. Ultras tend to be more conspicuous when they travel, proudly displaying their scarves and club colours while arriving en masse, which allows the police to keep a close eye on their movements.

See also
Curva
Hooligan
List of association football rivalries
List of hooligan firms
Barra brava
Torcida organizada

References

Further reading
 Guerra Nicola (2014). "Il discorso e la lingua speciale del calcio, una definizione inclusiva. I meccanismi di creazione dei neologismi e le dinamiche di contatto e interferenza" Annals of the University of Craiova 
 
 
 Prof. Dr. Gunter A. Pilz:   Leibniz University Hanover, 18 January 2010.
 Testa, A. and Armstrong, G. (2008). "Words and actions: Italian ultras and neo-fascism" Social Identities, vol. 14 (4),  pp. 473 – 490
 Testa, A. (2009) "UltraS: an Emerging Social Movement", Review of European Studies, vol. 1 (2), 54–63
 Testa, A. (2010). Contested Meanings: the Italian Media and the UltraS. Review of European Studies, vol 2(1), 15–24
 Testa, A. and Armstrong, G. (in press; November 2010). Football, Fascism and Fandom: The UltraS of Italian Football, A&C (Bloomsbury), London, Black Publishers.
 TAL Global Corporation.d

External links 

|}

 
Association football culture
Association football supporters